The 2014 Judo Grand Prix Budapest was held in Budapest, Hungary from 21 to 22 June 2014.

Medal summary

Men's events

Women's events

Source Results

Medal table

References

External links
 

2014 IJF World Tour
2014 Judo Grand Prix
Judo
Grand Prix 2014
Judo
Judo